WC and the Maad Circle was an American hip hop group from Los Angeles, California that consisted of WC, Big Gee, Coolio and DJ Crazy Toones.

History
MAAD stands for Minority Alliance of Anti-Discrimination. Following the dissolution of Low Profile, the rapper WC formed the group and released the albums Ain't a Damn Thang Changed in 1991 and Curb Servin' in 1995. The albums spawned some popular singles, notably "Dress Code", "West Up!" and "The One".

WC would later leave the group and form the gangsta rap supergroup Westside Connection with Ice Cube and Mack 10. WC and Crazy Toones continued working together at Ice Cube's Lench Mob Records.

On January 9, 2017, Crazy Toones died at age 45 of a heart attack.

On September 28, 2022, Coolio was found unresponsive on a friend's bathroom floor and died of an apparent heart attack.

Discography

Studio albums

Singles

References

Hip hop groups from California
Musical groups from Los Angeles
Musical groups established in 1990
Musical groups disestablished in 1996
1990 establishments in California
1996 disestablishments in California
African-American musical groups
Musical quartets
Gangsta rap groups
G-funk groups